The 1936 SANFL Grand Final was an Australian rules football competition.  beat  97 to 94.

References 

SANFL Grand Finals
SANFL Grand Final, 1936